Student of the Year is a 2012 Indian Hindi-language coming-of-age romantic comedy-drama film directed by Karan Johar, written by Rensil D'Silva and Niranjan Iyengar on the basis of an uncredited story by Johar, and produced by Hiroo Yash Johar and Gauri Khan under the banners of Dharma Productions and Red Chillies Entertainment. The film stars debutantes Sidharth Malhotra, Alia Bhatt and Varun Dhawan in the lead roles, and Rishi Kapoor, Sana Saeed, Ronit Roy, Sahil Anand, Ram Kapoor and Farida Jalal in supporting roles.

Being Johar's only directorial venture to not star Shah Rukh Khan, who nonetheless presented it, Student of the Year released on 19 October 2012 across India, and was one of the highest-grossing Bollywood films of 2012. It received mixed reviews from critics, with praise directed towards the performances of its three leads and the film's music, but was criticized for its story and screenplay.

At the 58th Filmfare Awards, Student of the Year received 4 nominations, including Best Male Debut (Malhotra and Dhawan) and Best Female Debut (Bhatt).

A standalone sequel, Student of the Year 2, directed by Punit Malhotra, was released on 10 May 2019, starring Tiger Shroff alongside debutantes Tara Sutaria and Ananya Pandey. Alia Bhatt made a special appearance in the film.

Plot
Terminally ill and on his deathbed, former Dean of St. Teresa's College, Yogendra "Yogi" Vashisht, requests to see the students from his last batch. Some of them arrive to meet him and hold themselves responsible for the lively Dean having fallen ill. The film then goes into a flashback set ten years back.

Rohan "Ro" Nanda is a handsome, popular guy in the college and the son of its trustee, tycoon Ashok Nanda. Ashok wants him to be a businessman like his elder son Ajay and dislikes his passion for music. Shanaya Singhania, a rich and highly popular girl in the college, is his girlfriend. She feels dissatisfied due to his constant flirting with Tanya Israni, another student and her nemesis. Abhimanyu "Abhi" Singh, a new student coming from a middle-class family, who wants to become rich like Ashok, soon becomes the college's heartthrob. Abhi is an orphan whose grandmother is the only person who he truly loves in his life. He and Ro initially do not get along but soon become best friends after a football match. Ro introduces him to Shanaya, reminding him to not get involved with her, but Abhi maintains that he is not interested. Kaizad "Sudo" Sodabottleopenerwala, a student who Ro is repulsive to, has a lot of admiration for Abhi, and in the process, he too becomes part of Abhi's, Ro's and Shanaya's circle.

At Ajay's wedding, Shanaya sees Ro flirting with Tanya and feels betrayed; in return, she openly flirts with Abhi, who tacitly hints her off, to make Ro jealous. Over this period, Abhi realizes that he, too, has fallen for Shanaya. Meanwhile, back at the school, the "Student of the Year" competition commences, with the first rounds being a quiz test, a treasure hunt and a dance battle. Shanaya slowly develops feelings for Abhi over the course of the competition. Abhi's grandmother becomes ill before the dance battle and Abhi's aunt berates him for bringing bad luck to every family he goes to. After the death of Abhi's grandmother, Shanaya helps him cope and, feeling attracted to each other in a tender moment, they share a kiss. Ro witnesses this, resulting in a fight between him and Abhi. Following an intense confrontation with Ashok back home, Ro is now determined to win the competition. Shanaya and her best friend Shruti fall out over the competition, and so does Ro and his friend Jeet, who always followed him around as a stooge. Shanaya goes with Jeet to the dance battle, and Abhi goes with Shruti, while Ro goes with Tanya. Shanaya, conflicted by her feelings, leaves in the middle of the dance battle, and she, Sudo and Tanya are eliminated.

The final round of the competition is a triathlon. Abhi, in the lead, during the end, surprisingly slows down, resulting in Ro winning the competition. Ro, however, declines to accept the award citing personal reasons. After Rohan steps down, Yogi is heavily berated by Sudo, who talks about how the Student of the Year competition has always been rigged from the start. Sudo says that the competition broke their friendship of two years and was unfair to people like Sudo, who wasn't as popular or attractive as Abhi or Rohan. After finishing his speech, he storms out. This causes Yogi to eventually retire. The students soon graduate and lose contact with each other.

Back in the present, Ro, a pop star and Abhi, a successful investment banker run into each other when they come to visit Yogi. Shanaya is now married to Abhi; he and Ro end up fighting while talking about their past and happen to release the anger they were holding back for the last ten years. Abhi also reveals the truth about the triathlon – he saw that Ashok was happy to see Ro losing and so he intentionally allowed Ro to win and that it was his way of surpassing Ashok in stature. Both of them realize how important their friendship is and reconcile. The film ends with both having a friendly running race.

Cast

 Sidharth Malhotra as Abhimanyu "Abhi" Singh, Shanaya's husband, Ro’s best friend 
 Alia Bhatt as Shanaya Singhania/Shanaya Abhimanyu Singh, Ro’s ex-girlfriend, Abhi's wife, Shruti’s best friend
 Varun Dhawan as Rohan "Ro" Nanda, Abhi’s best friend, Jeet’s best friend, Shanaya’s ex-boyfriend, Tanya’s flirt.
 Rishi Kapoor as Yogendra "Yogi" Vashisht, Dean of Saint Teresa
 Ronit Roy as Coach Karan Shah, Sports teacher of Saint Teresa
 Ram Kapoor as Ashok Nanda, Gayatri's husband, Rohan's father
 Sana Saeed as Tanya Israni, tries to be Ro's girlfriend. 
 Sahil Anand as Jeet Khurana, Ro's best friend-cum-sidekick
 Manasi Rachh as Shruti Pathak, Shanaya's best friend, Jiya’s mother 
 Kayoze Irani as Kaizad "Sudo" Sodabottleopenerwala, Shanaya, Abhi, Rohan, Tanya, Jeet and Shruti's friend
 Manjot Singh as Dimple "Dimpy" Singh
 Gautami Kapoor as Gayatri Nanda, Ashok's wife, Rohan's mother
 Farida Jalal as Sadhna Singh, Abhi's grandmother
 Akshay Anand as Dharamraj Singh, Abhi's uncle
 Manini Mishra as Geeta Singh, Abhi's aunt
 Prachi Shah as Ruchi Shah, Karan's wife
 Nandini Sen as Kamini Singhania, Shanaya's mother
 Boman Irani as Harikishan Sanon, Dean of Saint Lawrence
 Sushma Seth as Archana Vashisht, Yogi's mother

Special appearances
 Farah Khan as Judge in "The Disco Song"
 Vaibhavi Merchant as Judge in "The Disco Song"
 Kajol in "The Disco Song"

Production

Development

On 5 January 2011, both Karan Johar and Shah Rukh Khan uploaded the film's first poster on Twitter. The film marks the debuts of former model Sidharth Malhotra along with Alia Bhatt, daughter of filmmaker Mahesh Bhatt, Varun Dhawan, son of director David Dhawan, Kayoze Irani, son of Boman Irani, and as an adult, Sana Saeed, who portrayed Khan's screen daughter, in Kuch Kuch Hota Hai (1998), Johar's debut in Hindi cinema.

Malhotra and Dhawan had previously worked as assistant directors under Johar during the making of My Name Is Khan (2010).

The first official trailer was released on 2 August 2012. Johar later tweeted that the film will be released on 19 October 2012.

Filming
Most parts of the film were shot in Kashmir and Forest Research Institute, Dehradun. The external view of the school is that of the Kasiga School, Dehradun. The hospital scenes were 
filmed outside The Lalit, Grand Palace, Srinagar. Parts of the film were also shot in Thailand. Rob Miller, who had previously worked with Shah Rukh Khan on Chak De! India (2007), was hired to direct the sports sequences.

Marketing and release
The film targeted viewers with contest-based marketing.

Tata Motors, the on-ground promotion partner for the film, launched the 'Nano Student of the Year' contest judging students on academics, culture, sports, and social life. The top 8 finalists competed for the 'Nano Student of the Year' title.

The makers partnered with FedEx Express announcing a special 'FedEx Student Offer' and launch of 'FedEx International Student of the Year' campaign. It was aimed at individuals in India applying for higher education abroad.

Late in October 2021, the film's satellite rights, along with those of Agneepath and Yeh Jawaani Hai Deewani were purchased and renewed by Colors Cineplex.

Reception

Critical reception 
Student of the Year received mixed reviews from critics, with praise directed towards the performances of its three leads and the film's music, but received sharp criticism for its escapist story and screenplay.

Taran Adarsh of Bollywood Hungama gave it 4/5 stars, saying, "Student of the Year is a love story that traverses the trodden path. But KJo is an artisan with intellect and taste and he ensures that the script is spruced up and modernized with such elan that it doesn't offend the spectator's wisdom or intelligence." He added, "This is an escapist cinema at its best! [...] This one's entertainment, entertainment, and entertainment at its best." Komal Nahta also gave it 4/5 calling it a "supremely-entertaining" film.

Raita Tandon of Filmfare gave it 4/5 stars stating that the "world is surreal and spectacular yet it has moments that will bring you back to reality and warm the cockles of your heart. This is escapism at its best." Rajeev Masand of CNN-IBN gave it 3/5 stars and wrote, "Nitpickings aside, this is a breezy, enjoyable film by a director who knows his craft." He remarked, "If fun is what you’re seeking, you won't be disappointed."

Giving the film 3/5 stars, Anupama Chopra of Hindustan Times wrote, "He [Karan Johar] creates fantastical worlds brimming with beautiful people and expensive things and yet anchors them in high emotion. His films work as both designer-porn and soap-opera." She also praised the performance of the cast. Saibal Chatterjee of NDTV gave the film 2.5/5 stars, commenting that "Student of the Year definitely isn't the film of the year. But if you like your entertainment to be served up with glitzy but pulpy garnishing, pirouette your way to the nearest screen by all means."

Ananya Bhattacharya of Zee News gave the film 2/5 stars, saying that "Student of the Year is worth a watch only for the debutantes. They have pulled off a tough task of playing praiseworthy roles in a film which suffers from the lack-of-a-story syndrome."

Box office
Critics were skeptical over the success of the much-hyped film. Additionally, it starred debutantes in the lead roles, and had a high budget. However, the film became the biggest opener, not starring mainstream actors, in Bollywood, and surpassed trade expectations to profit both makers and distributors in the first week itself.

India
Student of the Year had a good opening collecting  on its opening day. It showed growth on its second day and collected . It had collected  by the end of its first week.

Overseas
Student of the Year collected about US$1.25 million, which Box Office India considered was a poor showing for a release on 300 screens. The film fell in the second week in most markets and closed at around $3 million from overseas markets.

Soundtrack

The soundtrack was composed by Vishal–Shekhar with the lyrics penned by Anvita Dutt Guptan. "The Disco Song" is a revamped cover version of "Disco Deewane" (1981) by Nazia Hassan, incorporating her vocals along with those of Sunidhi Chauhan and Benny Dayal.

The soundtrack received positive reviews from music critics. Joginder Tuteja of Bollywood Hungama gave the album 4/5 stars, saying that "Student of the Year is a winner with Vishal Shekhar (yet again!) justifying their stance of doing a few films but lending quality sound to it." IANS of CNN-IBN gave the album 4/5 stars, concluding that "The soundtrack of Student of the Year is a good mix with very minor flaws that can surely be ignored to enjoy the music that perfectly describes the mood of the movie."

The romantic track "Ishq Wala Love" became the biggest hit of the album, ranking in Radio Mirchi's Top 20 until 2013.

The song "Radha" sampled the song "Dafli Wale Dafli Baja" (that originally had music by Laxmikant-Pyarelal and lyrics by Anand Bakshi) from the film Sargam (1979), which also starred Kapoor in the lead.

Awards and nominations

References

External links

 
 
 

 

2010s Hindi-language films
Films set in Dehradun
2012 romantic comedy-drama films
Indian romantic comedy-drama films
2012 films
Films shot in Uttarakhand
Films directed by Karan Johar
Films scored by Vishal–Shekhar
Indian coming-of-age comedy-drama films
Films set in universities and colleges
Red Chillies Entertainment films
Indian LGBT-related films
2012 comedy films
2012 drama films